Sultana Zafar was a Pakistani actress. Sultana acted in numerous television dramas. She was known for her roles in dramas Munkir, Ana, Zid and Tanhaiyaan. She used to run her boutique called Armale Studios.

Early life
Sultana was born in 1955 on 21 February in Hyderabad, Pakistan. She completed her studies at the University of Hyderabad.

Career
Sultana went to Karachi PTV Centre and started acting in 1972. Sultana was known for being well-mannered, fine speech and graceful lady which helped her and became reasons for her success in acting career. She was also known for her serious style acting with her Hyderabad accent dialogue delivery. Sultana portrayed characters of family values and traditions of the time of PTV in 1970s, 1980s and 1990s and she was noted for her roles in dramas Akhri Chattan, Aroosa, Khala Khairan and Aangan Terha. She also appeared in dramas Akhri Chattan, Nadan Nadia, Ana, Zeenat, Tanhaiyaan and Babar. Since then she appeared in dramas Ru Baru, Zid, Haq Meher, Woh and Munkir.

Personal life
Sultana was married and had three children and she used to live in America in Dallas. There she used to run her boutique called Armale Studios. Huma Akbar, an actress, is her niece, together they worked in drama Shaheen and Huma also appeared in dramas Karawan, Choti Choti Baatein and Khaleej.

Death
Sultana died at age 69 in Dallas in Texas on 16 July 2021.

Filmography

Television

Telefilm

References

External links
 

1955 births
20th-century Pakistani actresses
Pakistani television actresses
21st-century Pakistani actresses
People from Hyderabad, Sindh
2021 deaths
Pakistani film actresses